TV5 (also known as 5 and formerly known as ABC) is a Philippine free-to-air television network and radio based in Mandaluyong, with its alternate studios located in Novaliches, Quezon City. It is the flagship property of TV5 Network, Inc. a both owned by MediaQuest Holdings, the multimedia arm of Philippine-based telecommunications company PLDT. TV5 is also formally referred to as "The Kapatid Network", the Filipino term for "sibling", which was introduced in 2010.

Named after its flagship station in Metro Manila, DWET-TV, which are carried in VHF Channel 5 (analog broadcast), UHF Channel 18 (digital test broadcast) and UHF Channel 51 (digital test broadcast; the latter is licensed to TV5's sister company Mediascape/Cignal TV), TV5 is also broadcasting to seven other owned-and-operated stations and nine affiliate television stations nationwide, as well as on all cable and satellite TV providers nationwide. Its programming is also available outside the Philippines through Kapatid Channel and AksyonTV International.

History

The early years (1960–1972)
Joaquin "Chino" Roces, owner of the Manila Times was granted a radio-TV franchise from Congress under Republic Act 2945 on June 19, 1960. He then founded the Associated Broadcasting Corporation with its first studios along Pasong Tamo — with DZMT 1100 kHz, DZTM 1380 kHz and DZWS 1070 kHz as its first radio stations. It became the fourth television network in the country, when it established DZTM-TV Channel 5. ABC operated radio and television services from 1960 until September 23, 1972, when President Ferdinand E. Marcos declared Martial Law. Both ABC and the Manila Times were forcibly shut down as a result with rivals ABS-CBN, RBS, MBC and RMN–IBC's radio and television broadcasts also shut down by martial law that day.

After the People Power Revolution in 1986, Chino Roces made a successful representation with President Corazon Cojuangco-Aquino for the network's reinstatement. ABC's rival ABS-CBN reopened that year but ABC was not yet reopened until it made a test broadcast in 1991 and finally reopened in 1992. Roces died in 1988, but his son Edgardo Roces would reopen the network after.

New stockholders led by broadcast veteran Edward Tan and Chino Roces's son Edgardo then began the arduous task of resuming broadcasts. The Securities and Exchange Commission granted their application for an increase in capitalization and amendments to ABC's articles of incorporation and by-laws. They were subsequently granted a permit to operate by the National Telecommunications Commission (NTC).

The return and growth (1992–2003)
ABC inaugurated its studio complex and transmitter tower in San Bartolome, Novaliches, Quezon City in 1990 and began conducting test broadcasts by airing Japan documentaries at the end of 1991; officially and finally returning to the air as the Associated Broadcasting Company on February 21, 1992, with the different callsign of the flagship station, DWET-TV and the corporate name, Associated Broadcasting Company, which the Company uses C as the corporate initial instead of keeping Corporation, the name of the original ABC, along its original callsign, DZTM-TV, during the pre-martial law years as a result of the new management of the now revived network which took over its operations.

ABC acquired a new 25-year franchise to operate on December 9, 1994, under Republic Act 7831 signed by President Fidel Valdez Ramos. In the same year, it went on nationwide satellite broadcasting. In a surge of phenomenal growth, ABC earned its reputation as "The Fastest Growing Network" under new network executive Tina Monzon-Palma who served as Chief Operating Officer.

In 2001, ABC began to produce local versions of The Price Is Right (hosted by Dawn Zulueta and later acquired by ABS-CBN); Wheel of Fortune (hosted by Rustom Padilla, later acquired by ABS-CBN); and Family Feud (hosted by Ogie Alcasid, later acquired by GMA Network, then by ABS-CBN, and later reverted back to GMA). This was during the height of the game show frenzy within Philippine networks brought on by the success of IBC's Philippine editions of Who Wants to Be a Millionaire? (hosted by Christopher de Leon, which is later transferred to TV5 hosted by Vic Sotto) and The Weakest Link (hosted by Edu Manzano).

The Cojuangco era (2003–2008)
In June 2003, The Tan-Roces joint consortium sold ABC TV and radio stations to the group led by businessman Antonio "Tonyboy" O. Cojuangco, Jr. former Chairman of the Philippine Long Distance Telephone Company (PLDT) and owner of Dream Satellite TV and Bank of Commerce, among other assets it later formally acquired in October of the same year. Cojuangco was the president and CEO of ABC, while Jose T. Pardo, a former secretary of the Department of Trade and Industry also was the network's board chairman at the time. The new management introduced many changes including a stronger news and public affairs division, modernization of its broadcast equipment, and the acquisition of broadcast rights of Philippine Basketball Association games. Additionally, the new network executives led by Roberto Barreiro coined a new slogan, "Iba Tayo!" ("We're Different!") which was conceived at the height of the "network wars" between ABS-CBN and GMA, with each of these two networks offering programming that bear the same format. ABC aimed to veer away from this practice by coming up with different shows with fresh and distinct formats to complement its flagship program, the PBA, targeting the burgeoning middle to upper-class youth market. ABC continued to support Family Rosary Crusade, and its religious pre-identification campaign "Please Pray the Rosary" was played before every program on the network until the plug gradually phased out due to the network's programming revamp.

In 2005, ABC won the "Outstanding TV Station" award at the 2005 KBP Golden Dove Awards, with several other programs on the network also earning awards in their respective categories.

In early 2007, ABC implemented a series of budget cuts, primarily directed towards its news department, which laid off most of its employees. The cuts, held prior to the 2007 general elections, left ABC almost incapable of coverage.

In November 2007, ABC debuted an array of new sports programming, including NBA basketball, pro boxing, and WWE events, as part of a new five-year deal with Solar Entertainment. However, due to their high costs and poor ratings, these programs were later dropped throughout 2008, and its NBA review show "House of Hoops" was cut back as well and eventually cancelled by April 2008. However, much of these programs, along with the PBA (as ABC elected not to renew its contract that ended after the 2008 Fiesta Conference), would be picked up by RPN, who had begun a much wider partnership with Solar earlier in 2007, which led to its privatization by the latter in 2011.

First TV5 era (2008–2018)

ABC-MPB Primedia partnership (2008–2010) 
In March 2008, Cojuangco announced that ABC had reached a partnership with MPB Primedia Inc., a local company backed by Media Prima Berhad of Malaysia as part of a long-term strategy to eventually make the network more competitive amidst the rising network wars between ABS-CBN and GMA. MPB Primedia, meanwhile, was formed to serve as seed asset for Media Prima's proposed private equity fund to invest in various media companies within Southeast Asia. Cojuangco said MPB Primedia Inc., in principle, would produce and source most of the entertainment programs while ABC would continue to be responsible for news programming and operation of the stations. MPB Primedia was also given exclusive right to schedule and manage sale of ABC-5's airtime. Christopher Sy was named CEO of MPB Primedia, Inc.; he served in that capacity until his resignation in January 2009 due to reported differences in management style.

ABC signed off for the last time at around 22:00 PHT on August 8, 2008, with its late night newscast Sentro as the last program on air, and then aired a countdown to its re-launch for much of the next day until 19:00 PHT, when the network officially re-launched under its new name of TV5. While keeping its programming lineup still an alternative to the other networks, it is now catered to "progressive Pinoys including those young at heart" (market classes C and D), and unveiled its newly upgraded 120-kilowatt state-of-the-art stereo TV transmitter. Shall We Dance, some shows in Nick on TV5, Kerygma TV, Light Talk, and Sunday TV Mass were the only ABC programs that were carried over to the line-up of TV5.

In December 2008, a lawsuit was filed by GMA Network, Inc., Citynet Television and ZOE Broadcasting Network against ABC, MPB, and MPB Primedia, alleging that TV5's lease of airtime to Media Prima was intended to circumvent regulations restricting foreign ownership of broadcasting companies. In response, ABC's media relations head Pat Marcelo-Magbanua reiterated that the network was a Filipino company that was self-registered and Filipino-run.

Despite the lawsuit, the network's ratings were revitalized by the new management, as its audience share increased from 1.9% in May–June 2008 (prior to the re-branding) to 11.1% in September 2009.

Acquisition by PLDT, the Kapatid Network years (2010–2018)
On October 20, 2009, Media Prima announced that it would be divesting its share in MPB Primedia / TV5, along with its affiliate ABC TV stations, and selling it to the Philippine Long Distance Telephone Company's broadcasting division, MediaQuest Holdings as it contributes to the company's losses during the year. The acquisition was officially announced by Chairman Manuel V. Pangilinan on March 2, 2010, along with the announcement of a new lineup of programming to debut on the network through a trade launch at the World Trade Center weeks later, as well as a new campaign branding itself as the "Kapatid" ("sibling") network, their response to be at par with its rivals ABS-CBN and GMA Network. Dream FM and its affiliate stations in other parts of the country were not part of the acquisition and remained under the Cojuangco management led by former ABC stockholder Anton Lagdameo; which then acquired a non-controlling share on Interactive Broadcast Media, to continue the operation of the stations, which became collectively known as the Dream FM Network, with IBMI as its licensee until its closure in June 2011, with the airtime of its flagship Manila station being sold to Ultrasonic Broadcasting System and relaunched as Energy FM.

On October 1, 2010, TV5 took over the management of MediaQuest's Nation Broadcasting Corporation stations; DWFM was re-launched as a TV5-branded news radio station on November 8 of the same year, Radyo5 92.3 News FM, and DWNB-TV was re-launched as AksyonTV on February 21, 2011, a news channel based on TV5's newscast Aksyon. At its peak, while retaining current position, TV5 was able to outrank GMA Network and become second most-watched network in key cities in Visayas and Mindanao, including Iloilo, Cebu, Bacolod, Davao, Cagayan de Oro; and even shared the top spot with ABS-CBN in General Santos.

On December 23, 2013, the network began broadcasting from its new headquarters, the 6,000-square meter TV5 Media Center located in Reliance, Mandaluyong.

In 2014, ABC Development Corporation acquired Filipino broadcast rights to the 2014 Winter Olympics, 2014 Summer Youth Olympics and the 2016 Summer Olympics.

Despite financial struggles within the management, TV5 continued to be on top as one of the top three television networks in the country with male and younger viewers dominated the audience reach due to the network's broadcast of the PBA via Sports5 and the strengthened TV5 Kids block, which included the Marvel Studios animation programs in October 2014.  The network celebrated its fifth anniversary under the management of Manny V. Pangilinan coinciding with its trade launch of 2015 shows held at the Sofitel Philippine Plaza on November 26, 2014.

The network opened the year 2015 with a New Year's Eve countdown entitled Happy sa 2015 at the Quezon Memorial Circle, and continued to hold such revelry there until 2017.

In 2015, the network changed its corporate name from ABC Development Corporation to TV5 Network, Inc.

However, by that point, the network incurred increasing losses and debts brought about by few advertisers (e.g. Unilever) as well as digitalization. This forced the network to implement a series of retrenchment of its employees. The biggest retrenchment happened in September 2015, when TV5's in-house entertainment division got on the verge of dissolution and initiated layoffs. At the same time, the consultancy contract of its Chief Entertainment Content Officer, Wilma Galvante, also expired. From 4,000 employees throughout 2013 and 2014, TV5 now has at least 900 employees as of late 2021.

Unable to produce original content until 2020, TV5 appointed Viva Entertainment CEO, Vicente "Vic" Del Rosario as the network's new Chief Entertainment Strategist, implementing changes on TV5's entertainment programming. These included a formation of the Viva-TV5 joint venture Sari-Sari Channel and outsourcing Viva Television for its entertainment shows, which were formally announced through a trade launch at the Valkyrie in Bonifacio Global City, Taguig on November 25, 2015. These included a revival of Ang Panday, the return of Diether Ocampo and Claudine Barretto's tandem in Bakit Manipis ang Ulap? and shows from by-then sister station MTV Pinoy such as Top 20 Pilipinas. New shows started to air from that period until February 2016 but were cancelled a few months later due to lack of advertisement support and poor ratings. (Viva rekindled its partnership with the network in October 2020, with the offerings dominated by local versions of foreign programming such as Masked Singer, The Wall, 1000 Heartbeats, Encounter and Rolling In It as well as TV remakes of Viva classic films such as Puto and a movie block entitled Sari-Sari Presents: Viva Cinema which marks the first time since 2005 that the channel airs a Viva movie block)

Since January 2016, TV5 and Cignal via Hyper was the official Free TV and Pay TV partner, respectively, of the Ultimate Fighting Championship in the Philippines, this lasted until December 31, 2018.

In July 2016, TV5 began airing selected programs from MTV and MTV International like Catfish, Ridiculousness and Ex on the Beach after inking a deal with Viacom International Media Networks that month to create the new MTV on TV5 block.

On September 8, 2016, TV5 cancelled its locally produced programs Aksyon Bisaya (Cebu) and Aksyon Dabaw (Davao) due to cost-cutting measures. However, the personnel remained employed as they will continue filing reports for the national edition of Aksyon.

On September 30, 2016, TV5 President and CEO Emmanuel "Noel" C. Lorenzana stepped down from his position. He was replaced by basketball coach and Sports5/D5 Studio head, Vicente "Chot" Reyes the following day. Following his appointment, the network announced it would be retrenching around 200 employees as part of TV5's digitalization.

In April 2017, TV5 acquired the rights to air the WWE after Fox Philippines decision to not renew its contract with the WWE due to unknown reasons. The network previously handle the rights from 2007 to 2008 and 2010.

On October 12, 2017, TV5 Network announced its partnership with ESPN, licensing its PBA, UFC, PSL and NFL rights and giving TV5 access to ESPN programs and content. The partnership formed the ESPN5 brand, airing on TV5 and AksyonTV. The said deal comes in response to the network's formal, albeit temporary shift from a general entertainment station to a sports and news channel.

The 5 Network era and reverting as TV5 (2018–2020) 
On February 17, 2018, in line with the recent changes within the network and in celebration of its 26th anniversary as a commercial TV network, TV5 was relaunched as The 5 Network or simply 5 with a new logo and station ID entitled Get It on 5, whereas the word TV on the top right quadrant of the logo was dropped, making it more flexible for the other divisions to use it as part of their own identity. Aside from the rebranding, TV5's programming grid was divided into three blocks: ESPN5 (sports), News 5, and On 5 (for other programs), along with D5 Studio (digital content) and Studio 5 (featuring world-class Filipino productions for audiences across all platforms). During that period, the Kapatid moniker was also de-emphasized and was only used by News5 and ESPN5 for some of its programs. A few months later came the more visible change within that period, which was the gradual phaseout of Filipino-dubbed movies and foreign-acquired programming, a practice that started during the operations under the MPB Primedia era in 2008. For a while until 2019, its Disney programs and its movies aired in the original audio.

On January 13, 2019, coinciding with the reformat of AksyonTV to 5 Plus, TV5 introduced a variation of its 2018 logo. It also included the websites of the division producing the program airing (e.g. TV5.com.ph for entertainment and blocktimers) as part of their on-screen graphics.

On April 22, 2019, TV5's granted a 25-year legislative franchise extension under Republic Act No. 11320 albeit without President Rodrigo Duterte's signature as the bill lapsed into law after 30 days of inaction.

On June 3, 2019, Chot Reyes retired as TV5 President and CEO. He was immediately replaced by Jane Basas, who also leads pay-TV provider and radio company Cignal TV/Mediascape. Upon her appointment, the network began to outsource news and sports programming from its co-owned Cignal channels One News, One PH, One Sports, and PBA Rush; it also phased out its daytime ESPN5 programs and relegated it to sister free-TV station 5 Plus in favor of archived entertainment programs and expanded movie blocks. Jane Basas later revealed future plans for the network; that included retaining its existing news programs and sports content in primetime, and reintroducing original entertainment programming through outsourcing from Cignal Entertainment and other major blocktimers. The network also saw the return of former TV5 executive Perci Intalan as the station's head of programming in November.

On February 4, 2020, Robert P. Galang was appointed as the new president and CEO of TV5 Network and Cignal TV, replacing Basas who in turn, was appointed as the new Chief Marketing Officer of Smart Communications.

On March 8, 2020, 5's sister channel 5 Plus was relaunched as One Sports (moving from being a Cignal-exclusive pay television channel), with the ESPN5 division also being renamed and merged to the abovementioned brand. As a result, all sports programming on 5 no longer carried the ESPN5 banner. Despite the change, the ESPN5 partnership continued online, with ESPN5.com serving as the de facto sports portal of both One Sports and ESPN in the Philippines, until October 13, 2021. On the same day, TV5 Network announced that 5 would be rebranded as One TV (adopting from Cignal TV's "One"-branded channels), which was originally scheduled on April 13, 2020. However, due to the ongoing COVID-19 pandemic (and the implementation of the enhanced community quarantine), the network postponed it. In June 2020 (after Metro Manila was placed in general community quarantine), the network announced that the rebrand would be pushed through on July 20, but on July 4, the network officially cancelled the change due to netizens' adverse reaction to the upcoming rebrand as well as the opinions of the network's loyal viewers and fans. Viewers complained that it would have confused them and potentially diminished viewership. Due to this, the plugs of One TV (both on-air and online) were later pulled out of circulation. On July 20, 2020, 5 brings out new Filipino-dubbed series and more entertainment content on primetime then later it announced that 5 will be reverted as TV5.

On July 27, 2020, Cignal TV, TV5 and their sister company, Smart Communications announced its multi-year deal with the National Basketball Association for the league's official broadcast rights in the Philippines, replacing Solar Entertainment Corporation. The games during the 2019–20 season will be aired live on free-to-air networks TV5 and sister channel One Sports (replacing CNN Philippines as an exclusive but temporary free-to-air broadcaster, which eventually dropped in March because of the COVID-19 pandemic in the United States and Canada, as well as the 4 month suspension of league play). This is the first time the NBA broadcasts on TV5 since the then-ABC 5 last aired the NBA games (in partnership with Solar Entertainment Corporation) from 2007 to 2008.

Second TV5 era and collaboration with Cignal TV (2020–present) 

On August 15, 2020, 5 reverted to its former name, TV5 (while retaining the variation of its current numerical logo that was introduced in January 2019), as the network announced its partnership with sister company, Cignal TV as TV5's main content provider to handle its programming in order to bring back the glory days of TV5 to compete again with its rival TV network, GMA Network and other TV networks in the Philippines. On the same day, TV5 unveiled its first wave of entertainment programs produced by blocktimers, among them Archangel Media, ContentCows Company, Inc., Luminus Productions, Inc. (and later Viva Television and Brightlight Productions), which were part of the supposed lineup for now-cancelled rebranding of TV5 as One TV. In addition, shows from the foreclosed ABS-CBN were announced to be transferred to TV5 as the former implemented retrenchments following the non-renewal of the former's broadcast franchise. Currently, TV5 is in talks with the same network for the possibility to hire the displaced employees of its former rival with TV5 chairman Manuel V. Pangilinan stating that they are open to work with them. In mid-September 2020, TV5 unveils second wave of new programming line-up for October (including programs that produced by its blocktimers Viva Entertainment, Brightlight Productions, and in-house News5 produced shows).

In January 2021, TV5 carried selected programming produced by its former rival ABS-CBN to expand its nationwide reach following the shutdown of its free-to-air network on May 5, 2020 (host broadcasters Kapamilya Channel, Kapamilya Online Live and A2Z Channel 11 (blocktime with ZOE Broadcasting Network) only provides limited coverage for cable/satellite TV, Facebook and YouTube livestream and FTA Mega Manila viewers, respectively). On January 24, the Kapatid network began to simulcast ABS-CBN/Kapamilya Channel programming such as ASAP Natin 'To, FPJ: Da King movie block, Primetime Bida lineup, Idol Philippines (season 2), Everybody Sing, and Magandang Buhay as part of an agreement with ABS-CBN, Cignal TV and Brightlight Productions (which formerly leased the airtime now occupied by the two aforementioned shows). Coinciding with the announcement, the network unveiled its revamped programming under its new slogan TV5 TodoMax, wherein all programs are divided into five blocks: TodoMax Kids (cartoons and kids-oriented programming), TodoMax Serbisyo (Idol in Action), TodoMax Panalo (afternoon programming lineup), TodoMax Primetime Singko (news, game shows, dramas (original and Filipino-dubbed), PBA live game broadcast, and shows from the Primetime Bida lineup of ABS-CBN/Kapamilya Channel) and TodoMax Weekend (Saturday and Sunday programming lineup).

A few months later, after the network's programming revamp, according to the AGB-Nielsen survey, TV5 became number 2 most-watched TV network in primetime TV ratings due to a stronger ABS-CBN Entertainment primetime programs as well as the strengthened Cignal Entertainment primetime programs on the network.

On May 20, 2021, TV5 launched its new slogan Iba sa 5 (It's different on 5) with a new station jingle composed by Jeff Arcilla, and new station ID. At that time, the network's 2019 logo was changed into the new full colored darker red scheme, which is similar to the current Cignal 2013 logo.

On July 1, 2022, TV5 launched a new slogan Iba'ng Saya pag Sama-Sama (The Fun is One of a Kind When We're Together) with a new station jingle and new station ID, featuring the network's own stars and ABS-CBN stars.

In June 2022, ABS-CBN engaged into advanced talks with TV5's parent company, MediaQuest Holdings to allow its resources combined after Villar Group-backed Advanced Media Broadcasting System acquired ABS-CBN's former frequency, and slated to begin operations in October 2022 as AMBS-2. On August 10, 2022, ABS-CBN and MediaQuest Holdings signed a "convertible note agreement" as announced on the following day for the ABS-CBN's investment into TV5 Network by acquiring 34.99% of the company's common shares, with an option to increase it stake to 49.92% within the next eight years with MediaQuest remained as the TV5's controlling shareholder with 64.79% of TV5's common shares. Meanwhile, MediaQuest Holdings executed a "debt instruments agreement" by acquiring a 38.88% minority stake of ABS-CBN's cable TV arm Sky Cable Corporation through Cignal TV, with an option to acquire an additional 61.12% of Sky Cable shares within the next eight years. After ABS-CBN and TV5 had a partnership deal, the House of Representatives has set a briefing and SAGIP Representative Rodante Marcoleta commented that TV5 violated the broadcasting franchise with ABS-CBN deal. But a day later, the briefing scheduled was cancelled that supposed to happen on that day. On August 24, the two broadcasting companies agreed to pause their closing preparations for the deal following concerns from politicians and some government agencies. However, the agreement was terminated on September 1.

In January 31, 2023, Guido R. Zaballero as president and chief executive officer of TV5 Network, effective February 1, 2023. He will assume the position following the retirement of Robert P. Galang, who headed Cignal TV and TV5 since 2020. Meanwhile, Jane J. Basas has assumed the post of president and CEO of Cignal TV, concurrently with her role as the president and CEO of MediaQuest, the holding company of TV5 and Cignal TV.

Branding of TV5

Network identity
On June 19, 1960, newspaper publisher Joaquin "Chino" Roces launched its television station in the Philippines, then known as the Associated Broadcasting Corporation. Since then, the network evolved and used different brandings until it became widely known from what it is today.

Associated Broadcasting Corporation (1960–1972) — founded by Joaquin "Chino" Roces until it was forced to shut down in 1972 following the declaration of the Martial Law by President Marcos.
Associated Broadcasting Company (1992–2008) — fully restored after being granted a new franchise led by its new stockholders Edward Tan and Roces' son, Edgardo Roces. It was acquired by businessman Antonio O. Cojuangco Jr. in 2003.
TV5 (first era; 2008–2018) — renamed as TV5 after ABC entered a partnership with MPB Primedia, Inc. backed by the Malaysian media group Media Prima Berhad. In 2010, Media Prima divested its share with MediaQuest Holdings, Inc. to business tycoon Manuel V. Pangilinan. Upon relaunch as 5, the TV5 branding became obsolete, only to be used during station sign-on and sign-off messages, social media accounts, and selected program teasers.
5 (The 5 Network) (2018–2020) — TV5 was relaunched as The 5 Network or simply 5 on February 17, 2018. The station launched its numerical 5 logo, making it more flexible for the other divisions to use it as part of their own identity, as its programming grid is divided into news, sports, and entertainment. Although, TV5 was still used to refer to both the channel and the company itself. "The 5 Network" branding was retired on August 14, 2020, though the 2019 numerical 5 logo variant was retained. The "5" naming was reinstated in 2021 only for TV5's current slogan, "Iba sa 5".
One TV (cancelled; 2020) — supposed to be rebranded on April 13, 2020, and later on July 20, 2020. But due to the confusion of viewers and the ongoing COVID-19 pandemic, the rebranding plans to One TV were later cancelled, with the station reverting to TV5.
TV5 (second era; 2020–present) — It was officially restored as the network's full-time identity on August 15, 2020, coinciding with the return of local entertainment programs to the station. The "TV5" word are most often used for their program teasers on TV, radio and via their social media accounts.

Logos
TV5 used several logos since it was established in 1960. In 1960, the network used a 5 Logo derived from its flagship station in Metro Manila, DZTM-TV carried in VHF channel 5 until it was shut down in 1972. When it returned to the airwaves, the network used a more-known ABC 5 logo with an iconic cyclone icon, incorporating the colors red, blue and green—colors making up a pixel shown on the television technology of 1992. The number 5 was removed to the logo in 1995 but retaining its ABC and the cyclone icon. In 2001, the logo added its slogan "Come home to ABC", the same logo used in April 2004 with its new slogan "Iba Tayo!". The last logo as ABC in September 2004 has been enclosed with a yellow circle. The logo changed after its re-launch in 2008 having the new name of the network TV5 inside a shaking television. In 2010, the network used a red circle being shined in the northwest corner carrying the name TV5 with the letters TV in the northeastern part above the largely sized number 5. The logo adopted a 3D version in 2013 and applying it on-air, although the 2010 2D version oftentimes appear.

In 2018, TV5 adopted its numerical 5 logo, which was first appeared on ESPN5 logo, which was launched in October 2017, dropping the "TV" word on the northeastern quadrant as part of their Get It on 5 campaign. They also started to display the name of the current program using the format: "(title) on 5" as the part of the logo (usually applied to entertainment and other programs not provided by either News5 or ESPN5; except blocktimers, where only the 5 logo is displayed) resulting to viewers mistakenly thought "on" was part of the title. The numerical five logo was also simultaneously adopted for TV5 sister divisions News5, Radyo 5, and D5 Studio.

A variation of the current numerical 5 logo was unveiled on January 13, 2019, similar to its former sister network, 5 Plus (now One Sports), though it was retained despite the renaming of 5 to TV5 in 2020. Another variation existed with a darker red color, which debuted alongside the launching of TV5's "Iba sa 5" slogan.

Programming

TV5 programs are consisting of news and public affairs, sports programming, movie blocks and special presentations, local dramas and soap operas, anime series, foreign cartoons, musical and variety shows, reality shows, comedy and gag shows, informative and talk shows, and religious programs. The network is the official broadcaster of the Philippine Basketball Association (PBA). It also airs Word of God Network every Monday to Saturday morning, and Catholic mass live from the church (usually from Veritas 846) every Sunday morning.

On the second month since its relaunch on August 9, 2008, TV5 reportedly entered the Top 3 TV stations based on the AGB Nielsen survey. The network also gained ratings on their morning cartoon blocks, starting from Nickelodeon programs, followed by select Cartoon Network and Disney Channel programs onwards. TV5 is best known for the popular AniMEGA anime programming block, which aired numerous Filipino-dubbed Japanese anime series first in Philippine television, including Code Geass, Shakugan no Shana, Azumanga Daioh, Special A, Makibaoh, Toradora!, Clannad, Yatterman, D.Gray-man, Fullmetal Alchemist: Brotherhood, and Gundam 00. The network is also notable for its original horror drama series Midnight DJ (2008–2011).

TV5 is also notorious for being the originator of tabloid talk shows in the Philippines which featured confrontations, physical fights and scantily clad guests; these include Face to Face, Face the People, Solved na Solved, and the public service program Idol in Action.

In 2013, TV5 launched the Weekend Do It Better and Everyday All The Way programming blocks under the helm of former chief entertainment content officer Wilma Galvante. However, most of the programs under these blocks were discontinued due to low ratings. In 2014, the network launched another set of new programs under the "Happy Ka Dito!" campaign.

In 2015, TV5 launched more than a dozen programs that were more focused on light entertainment and sports under its "Happy sa 2015" campaign. The return of the AniMEGA block in the same year featured the debut of hit anime series Sword Art Online (seasons 1 and 2) in Philippine television. Midway through 2015, TV5's entertainment programming were produced by different content providers, including Unitel Productions (TV5's sister company), The IdeaFirst Company (formed by former TV5 Entertainment Head Perci Intalan) and Content Cows Company Inc. (formed by Wilma Galvante). On October 14, 2015, TV5 named Sari-Sari Channel as the network's main entertainment production outfit. Viva executive Vic del Rosario was also appointed as the network's chief entertainment strategist, handling most of the entertainment programs broadcast by the network at that time. It happened a month after TV5, Cignal and Viva inked a deal to create Sari-Sari Channel.

In 2016, director Brillante Mendoza signed a contract with TV5 to produce made-for-TV movies for the network under the Brillante Mendoza Presents umbrella. At the same time, the network signed an exclusive deal to air programs from Rainbow S.p.A and DreamWorks Animation. For the first time, TV5 premiered The Walking Dead and La Reina del Sur in August 2016, both dubbed in Filipino.

In 2017, the TV5 AniMEGA block returned once again for a partnership with Aniplus Asia. TV5 has aired Japanese anime series including Attack on Titan: Junior High, Myriad Colors Phantom World, Kantai Collection, Knights of Sidonia, Norn9, and Is It Wrong to Try to Pick Up Girls in a Dungeon?, all dubbed in Filipino. Meanwhile, the National Football League (NFL) games were broadcast on TV5 from the 2017 season until the 2019 season. TV5 also aired selected local shows from Sari-Sari Channel under the Sari-Sari sa Weekends banner. The crime drama series Amo directed by Brillante Mendoza finally premiered on April 21, 2018, after several months of delay.

From late 2018 to September 2019, all foreign entertainment shows aired on TV5 were broadcast in original English-language audio. Some of the movie programming blocks were also aired in original English audio. Upon the expansion of TV5's movie blocks in September 2019, they reverted to Filipino dubbing.

The network usually aired online Catholic masses every Sunday morning. On March 22, 2020, during the enhanced community quarantine in Luzon, TV5 broadcasts online masses from the Manila Cathedral, alongside TV Maria and One PH every 10AM, and from Radyo Veritas 846 on 6AM and 6:30PM. This arrangement ended a few months later to give way for the reversion of regular programming and the broadcast of the remainder of the 2019–20 NBA season and the 2020 PBA season alongside One Sports as well as NBA TV Philippines for the former and PBA Rush for the latter, although the 6AM Mass from Radyo Veritas continues to be aired up to date. Following the acquisition for the NBA rights after the denial of the ABS-CBN franchise renewal and permanent closure of the ABS-CBN Sports division, TV5 is currently broadcasting the National Basketball Association (NBA) games replacing the National Football League (NFL) games.

Since mid-2020, TV5 began to fill the vacant spaces and replace provisional reruns of their former programs due to lack of sporting events because of the COVID-19 pandemic. TV5 also brought back Filipino-dubbed telenovelas on Philippine television with Tierra de Reyes, Betty sa NY and Reina de Corazones. They even had the rights to air the Thalía-starred "Maria" trilogy: Marimar, María Mercedes and María la del Barrio. Meanwhile, the first batch of new local entertainment programs like Fill in the Bank, Bawal na Game Show, Chika, Besh! (all three produced by Archangel Media), Fit for Life (produced by Luminus Productions Inc.), and the return of Bangon Talentadong Pinoy (a co-production with The IdeaFirst Company) were launched on August 15, 2020. In October 2020, TV5 premiered six new local entertainment programs from Brightlight Productions owned by Albee Benitez. These are Sunday Noontime Live!, I Got You, Sunday 'Kada, Lunch Out Loud, Rated Korina (formerly Rated K under ABS-CBN), Oh My Dad!.

In January 2021, TV5 and Cignal TV announced a partnership with ABS-CBN Entertainment to allow more of its popular content to air on free television across the Philippines. Sunday Noontime Live! was cancelled to give way for the airing of ASAP Natin 'To starting January 24, 2021. TV5 also began simulcasting ABS-CBN's/Kapamilya Channel's Primetime Bida lineup since March 8, 2021. My Hero Academia is the first Japanese anime series previously broadcast by defunct channel Yey! (ABS-CBN TV Plus) that aired on TV5 starting October 23, 2021. More ABS-CBN/Kapamilya Channel programming are also being simulcasted on the network, such as Idol Philippines (season 2) and Everybody Sing.

In September 2022, TV5 bought the airing rights to air Moonbug preschool shows on Weekday mornings. These include Cocomelon and Little Baby Bum.

Kapatid Channel

TV5 programs are seen internationally via Kapatid Channel, and is currently available in Guam, the Middle East, North Africa, Europe, Canada, and the United States.

References

External links
Media Ownership Monitor Philippines - Television by VERA Files and Reporters Without Borders

1960 establishments in the Philippines
1992 establishments in the Philippines
 
Companies based in Mandaluyong
Companies based in Quezon City
Digital terrestrial television in the Philippines
Filipino-language television stations
Mass media companies of the Philippines
Television networks in the Philippines
Television channels and stations established in 1960
Television channels and stations disestablished in 1972
Television channels and stations established in 1992
Television in Metro Manila
TV5 Network channels